Fernando Navarro Corbacho (born 25 June 1982) is a Spanish former professional footballer. Mainly a left back, he could also play as a central defender.

He spent most of his professional career with Barcelona and Sevilla, winning three major titles with the latter club and playing 412 La Liga matches during 17 seasons, also appearing in the competition for Albacete, Mallorca and Deportivo.

Navarro represented Spain at Euro 2008, winning the tournament.

Club career

Barcelona and Mallorca
Born in Barcelona, Catalonia, Navarro came through the ranks of giants FC Barcelona, was on the verge of replacing longtime left back Sergi Barjuán who had left for Atlético Madrid in 2002, until a serious knee injury finished off his chances with hometown club. On 3 November 2002, he scored his only goal for Barça and his first as a professional, in a 1–1 away draw against Racing de Santander.

After an uneventful six-month loan at Albacete Balompié in 2004, also in La Liga, Navarro was loaned again, this time to RCD Mallorca (still in the top flight) for the 2005–06 season. After a successful campaign the Balearic Islands side decided to purchase him on a permanent deal, and he was an undisputed starter in the following two years.

Sevilla
On 18 June 2008, Navarro was bought by Sevilla FC for a reported €5 million. He was an automatic first-choice in his first two seasons combined as the Andalusians ranked respectively third and fourth. In this time he collected a combined 27 yellow cards.

In the following campaigns, with no real competitor in his position, Navarro continued to be an undisputed starter for Sevilla. On 26 October 2011, he renewed his contract, due to expire in June 2013, for a further three years. Late into the previous month, he was involved in an incident in a home fixture against Valencia CF: after opponent Aritz Aduriz stepped on Emir Spahić in the 70th minute, the latter's reaction was apparently exaggerated, but Navarro vehemently asked for a red card to Aduriz, which was conceded by the referee.

From the year 2013 onwards, after the emergence of youth graduate Alberto Moreno, Navarro appeared in several games as a central defender.

He won the UEFA Europa League in 2013–14 and in 2014–15 with Sevilla.

Deportivo
On 19 June 2015, aged 32, Navarro signed a two-year deal with fellow league team Deportivo de La Coruña, with an option for a third. Three years later, shortly after having been relegated, he announced his retirement.

International career
Spanish national team coach Luis Aragonés called Navarro for an exhibition game with France on 6 February 2008. He did not enter the pitch, however, going on to make his debut against the United States on 4 June in a 1–0 friendly win.

Selected for UEFA Euro 2008, Navarro appeared against Greece in the 2–1 group stage success, as Spain emerged victorious in the tournament. Previously, he played at the 1999 FIFA U-17 World Championship in New Zealand.

Career statistics

Club

Honours

Club 
Barcelona
La Liga: 2004–05

Sevilla
UEFA Europa League: 2013–14, 2014–15
Copa del Rey: 2009–10

International
Spain
UEFA European Championship: 2008

See also
 List of La Liga players (400+ appearances)

References

External links
 
 

1982 births
Living people
Footballers from Barcelona
Spanish footballers
Association football defenders
La Liga players
Segunda División B players
Tercera División players
FC Barcelona C players
FC Barcelona Atlètic players
FC Barcelona players
Albacete Balompié players
RCD Mallorca players
Sevilla FC players
Deportivo de La Coruña players
UEFA Europa League winning players
Spain youth international footballers
Spain under-21 international footballers
Spain international footballers
UEFA Euro 2008 players
UEFA European Championship-winning players
Catalonia international footballers